Dominique Ezquerra (born 5 March 1977) is an Argentine alpine skier. She competed in the women's super-G at the 1994 Winter Olympics.

References

External links
 

1977 births
Living people
Argentine female alpine skiers
Olympic alpine skiers of Argentina
Alpine skiers at the 1994 Winter Olympics
Sportspeople from Bariloche